The Indian 5-rupee note is the second smallest Indian note in circulation. The Reserve Bank of India introduced the 5 rupee banknote as part of the Mahatma Gandhi Series in 1996.

Languages

As like the other Indian rupee banknotes, the 5 banknote has its amount written in 17 languages. On the obverse, the denomination is written in English and Hindi. On the reverse is a language panel which displays the denomination of the note in 15 of the 22 official languages of India. The languages are displayed in alphabetical order. Languages included on the panel are Assamese, Bengali, Gujarati, Kannada, Kashmiri, Konkani, Malayalam, Marathi, Nepali, Odia, Punjabi, Sanskrit, Tamil, Telugu and Urdu.

See also

Indian 2-rupee note
Indian 5-rupee coin

References 

Rupee
Banknotes of India
Five-base-unit banknotes
Currencies introduced in 1996